The Xiaotang Mountain Han Shrine also known as the Guo Family Ancestral Hall (literally "Xiaotang Mountain Guo Family Tomb Stone Ancestral Hall") is a funerary stone shrine from the early Eastern Han dynasty (25-220 AD) situated on slopes of the Yellow River valley in the western part of Shandong Province, China. It is the only known offering shrine from this period known to be still standing in its original form. The Xiaotang Mountain Shrine has 
been identified with as the Guo Family shrine by some studies, linking it to the story of Guo Ju, the 
13th of the Confucian Twenty-four Filial Exemplars.

History
Funerary shrines have been built on top of the tombs of members of the 
upper nobility and feudal lords since 
the Warring States period (475-221 BC). Erecting such shrines as 
well as monumental towers became popular during the times of the Han Dynasty (207 BC-220 AD) and in particular in the era of the 
Eastern Han Dynasty (25-220 AD). The Xiaotang Mountain Han Shrine dates 
to the early Eastern Han Dynasty, but the exact date remains 
unknown. Historical inscriptions that were added 
to the shrine suggest that it dates back before the year 129 AD (the 
4th year of the reign of the Eastern Han Emperor Shun of Han), to 
which the earliest inscription on the shrine is dated. The second oldest inscription date is the 
year when Emperor Huan of Han of the Eastern Han changed his era 
name to "Yongkang" (in 
167 AD). The shrine is mentioned in the 
"Commentary to the River Classic" (Shui Jing Zhu) by the 
Northern Wei Dynasty scholar Li Daoyuan (died 527 AD). The shrine is also recorded in the 
"Catalogue of Inscriptions on Stone and Bone" by Zhao Mingcheng  (1081-1129 AD), a 
scholar-official and epigraphist in the Song Dynasty also known for being the husband to poet Li Qingzhao. The shrine was among the first 180 sites to be included in the List of Major National Historical and Cultural Sites on April 3, 1961.

Shrine
The Xiaotang Mountain Han Shrine is a free-standing masonry construction 
topped by a single-eaved and hanging hill-shaped roof.
The walls are made from black stones and 
An 
-tall octagonal stone pillar has been placed in the 
center of the shrine. The shrine is decorated with sunken images cut away from a surface as 
well as bas-relief images. The stone walls and the 
triangular stone girders are engraved with depictions of legendary 
tales, historic events, time keeping and astrology, royal audiences, 
travel, guest receptions, war campaigns, hunting, cooking, and 
recreation. Other architectural 
components of the shrine carry simpler decorations with motives such 
as lowered curtains and water chestnut. An inscription of particular cultural history and calligraphic 
value is the "Odes to Moving Filial Piety" (Gan Xiao Song) written by 
King of Longdong in the Northern Qi Dynasty (550-577 AD) and 
engraved on the outside gable of the shrine.

Filial piety
The shrine has been identified with the story of Guo 
Ju, the 13th of the 24 
Paragons of Filial Piety. Guo Ju is said 
to have lived during the time of the Han Dynasty. He prepared to bury 
his own infant son during a period of food shortage in order to 
preserve enough food to save his aging mother. When he dug the grave 
for his son, he found a treasure (inscribed as a gift to him) that 
allowed him to save his entire family.

Location

The Xiaotang Mountain Han Shrine is located on Xiaotang Mountain 
(literally "Filial Piety Hall Mountain").  Other names of the 
mountain are "Guishan" (literally "Tortoise Mountain") and "Wushan" (literally "Witch 
Mountain"). The mountain is located 
of the city center of Jinan.

See also 
 List of sites in Jinan

References

External links 
 Online article by the Jinan Tourism Administration

Buildings and structures in Jinan
Ancestral shrines in China
Tourist attractions in Jinan
Major National Historical and Cultural Sites in Shandong